The Church of St Dunstan is in Earle Road, Edge Hill, Liverpool, England.  It is an active Anglican church in the deanery of Toxteth and Wavertree, the archdeaconry of Liverpool, and the diocese of Liverpool.  Its benefice is united with two other local churches to form the Team Parish of St Luke in the City. The church is recorded in the National Heritage List for England as a designated Grade II* listed building.

History

The church was built between 1886 and 1889, and designed by Charles Aldridge and Charles Deacon. It was built for the family of Thomas Earle, and consecrated on 18 May 1889. The interior of the church was re-ordered in 1967, when an altar was placed in the nave and the north chapel was glazed in.

Architecture

St Dunstan's is constructed in red Ruabon brick and has a slate roof.  Its plan consists of a five bay nave with a clerestory and a northwest baptistry, north and south aisles, north and south porches, and a two-bay chancel with a north chapel and a south transept acting as an organ loft.  Towards the west end of the church is a copper-covered flèche containing two-light bell openings.  At the west end is the baptistry, and a west window consisting of five stepped lancets, which are flanked by octagonal turrets with pyramidal roofs containing lucarnes.  In the arch above the windows are carved symbols of the Evangelists, and the figure of Christ.  Along the sides of the church are lancet windows, three to each bay of the aisles, and one to each bay of the clerestory.  Above the entrance to the north porch is a diapered gable containing a statue of Saint Dunstan in a niche.  The east window consists of three stepped lancets.

Inside the church the five-bay arcade is carried on round stone piers. A frieze runs along the top of the arcade.  Other than the stone piers, the rest of the interior is in brick.  The alabaster reredos, and the wrought iron lectern were designed by Deacon.  Between the nave and the chancel is an iron screen. Also in the church are brass plaques to the memory of members of the Earle family.  In the west window is stained glass by Burlison and Grylls. The three-manual pipe organ was built in about 1880 by Henry Willis, but by 2002 it had become unplayable.

Commenting on the design, the description in the National Heritage List for England says it is a "severe but handsome design". Pollard and Pevsner in the Buildings of England series refer to the west front as "impressive if rather curious", and say that the "interior impresses with gloomy atmosphere".

Present day

As of 2015, St Dunstan's holds services every Sunday morning. The church was reordered in 2014.

See also

Grade II* listed buildings in Merseyside

References

External links

Churches completed in 1889
19th-century Church of England church buildings
Church of Saint Dunstan
Church of Saint Dunstan
Grade II* listed churches in Merseyside
Church of St Dunstan
Church of England church buildings in Merseyside
Gothic Revival church buildings in England
Gothic Revival architecture in Merseyside